Emamzadeh Shah Gheyb or Emamzadeh Shah-e Gheyb may refer to:
 Emamzadeh Shah-e Gheyb, Larestan